Arjun Modhwadia is an Indian National Congress politician from Porbandar Gujarat, India. He was the Leader of the Opposition in the Gujarat Legislative Assembly from 2004 to 2007. He had been a president of Gujarat Pradesh Congress Committee (GPCC), the Gujarat wing of Indian National Congress from 2 March 2011 to 20 December 2012.

Early life and career
Arjun Modhwadia was born at Modhwada, a village near Porbandar, on 17 February 1957. His schooling was at government primary school of the village. He graduated with a mechanical engineering degree from Lukhdhirji Engineering College in Morbi. He became Senate member of Saurashtra University as a Registered Graduate constituency representative in 1982 to 2002. In 1988 he also became a member of the Executive Council of the university. He worked as an assistant engineer with the Gujarat Maritime Board for 10 years. He left his job in 1993 and entered politics. He is married to Hiraben and has a son and a daughter.

He is associated with Maldevji Odedra Smarak Trust, Dr. Viram Godhania Mahila Arts, Commerce, Home Science and Computer Science College since 1988. He is a president of Gramya Bharati High School, Bayavadar since 2002 and a trustee of Sorath Kshay Nivaran Samiti, Keshod; an organization working for Tuberculosis patients, since 2004.

Political career
He joined Indian National Congress in 1997. In 2002, he contested assembly election and won. In 2002, he became a member of Delimitation Commission of India for Gujarat (Parliamentary and Assembly constituencies). He was also appointed a member of the Estimate Committee. He was the Leader of the Opposition of Gujarat Legislative Assembly from 2004 to 2007.

He was re-elected in 2007 and from 2008 to 2009 he was also the chairman of the media committee and Chief Spokesperson of GPCC. On 2 March 2011, he was selected as a 27th president of GPCC.

He also resigned from the post of president of GPCC on 20 December 2012 following defeat. He again lost in assembly election in 2017  against  Bharatiya Janata Party (BJP) candidate Babu Bokhiria. He was elected from Porbandar constituency again in 2022 Gujarat Legislative Assembly election as an INC candidate defeating his nearest rival and BJP candidate Babu Bokhiria.

Controversy
In November 2012, he was served with a show cause notice from Election Commission for calling Narendra Modi, a Monkey.

References

External links
 

Indian National Congress politicians
1957 births
Living people
Leaders of the Opposition in Gujarat
People from Porbandar district
Gujarat MLAs 2002–2007
Gujarat MLAs 2007–2012
Gujarat MLAs 2022–2027